Battalion is a 1937 Czechoslovak war drama film, directed by Miroslav Cikán. It stars František Smolík, Helena Bušová, and Hana Vítová.

Cast
František Smolík as JUDr. František Uher
Helena Bušová as Anna Uhrová
Hana Vítová as Marie Žďárská alias Mimi
Jaroslav Průcha as Václav Šulc
Václav Trégl as František Vondruška
František Kreuzmann as Beznoska
Ladislav Pešek as Honzík
Eduard Kohout as Ferdinand Koranda
Karel Veverka as Mašek
Milada Gampeová as Mrs. Mastná
Ella Nollová as Harphist
Marenka Zieglerová as Waitress in Battalion

References

External links
 

1937 films
Czechoslovak drama films
1930s war drama films
Films directed by Miroslav Cikán
Czech war drama films
Czechoslovak black-and-white films
1937 drama films
1930s Czech-language films
1930s Czech films